King's College School is a coeducational independent preparatory school for children aged 4 to 13 in Cambridge, England, situated on West Road off Grange Road, west of the city centre. It was founded to educate the choristers in the King's College Choir during the 15th century. Although no longer located on College grounds, it remains an integral part of the Chapel's musical tradition and is still governed by and receives some funding from the College. The school is part of the same historic foundation as Eton College. The most recent full integrated Independent Schools Inspectorate (ISI) inspection awarded the grade "excellent" in all 9 categories.

History
King's College was founded in 1441 by King Henry VI. By 1447 the full complement of 16 choristers had been recruited to sing in the chapel. They were likely educated by a fellow until the appointment of the first Informator Chorustarum (Master over the Choristers) in 1456, Robert Brantham. The existence of dedicated school rooms was recorded during a Marian visitation of the University in 1557 which inspected the "chorusters chamber and schole" and took away a number of books deemed to be unsuitable.

The school has moved location several times since its inception. By 1693 it was located in a building to the south-east of the chapel, next to King's Parade. In this year that building was demolished and replaced with what was known as the New Brick Building which continued to house the school through to the nineteenth century. In the 1820s during the rebuilding by William Wilkins, the brick building and adjoining Provost's Lodge were demolished, opening up a view of the chapel from the street. The outline of the foundations of the brick building can be seen on the lawn during long periods of hot dry weather.

In 1828 the Wilkins building on the south side of the court opposite the chapel was opened and the school was housed in rooms within it. By the 1870s in response to improving musical standards in other English choirs, it was decided to open a boarding house to accommodate choristers from outside Cambridge in order to widen the field from which selection of choristers could take place. This was opened on the current site in West Road in 1878, and by 1880 all 16 choristers were boarders, and there were also 8 non-chorister day pupils, a number that would gradually increase over the coming decades. From 1976 girls were admitted, and as the school expanded, it opened a pre-preparatory department.

Boarding
The boarding programme is open to boys and girls. Year 4 and 5 Choristers are weekly boarders.  Year 6 to 8 Choristers are full boarders, with the option to spend Friday nights at home (until Saturday lunchtime), while other boarders return home for the weekend.

Houses
Like many British schools, King's uses a house system. This is not a system related to boarding houses, of which there is only one at King's, but one of which pupils are placed into one of four houses, each named after a surrounding road or path. There are many inter-house competitions throughout the year in sports and academics, in the form of merits, awarded for good work, which are totalled and averaged each term, with the house with the highest average merits winning a house party.

Links with other schools
The school began a link project with Sri Siddharta Dikkumbura school in Sri Lanka in 2007 initially as a response to the 2004 Indian Ocean earthquake and tsunami, after a visit there by the then headmaster, Nicholas Robinson, but the link quickly went beyond aid and became more of an academic link, with three yearly teacher exchanges and many more exchanges of work between the schools to learn more about each culture. King's often raises funds to help the school, and has sent musical instruments and sports equipment to the school in Sri Lanka as well.

Alumni

Heads
The following headteachers have served since 1878 when the school relocated to its present site in West Road:

See also
List of oldest schools

References

External links
King's College School, Cambridge
ISI Inspection Report

Schools in Cambridge
Choir schools in England
School
Preparatory schools in Cambridgeshire
Educational institutions established in the 15th century
University-affiliated secondary schools